is a railway station in Yukuhashi, Fukuoka Prefecture, Japan. It is on the Tagawa Line, operated by the Heisei Chikuhō Railway. Trains arrive roughly every 30 minutes.

On 1 April 2009, a nearby industrial valve manufacturer, acquired naming rights to the station.

External links
Miyakoizumi Station (Heisei Chikuhō Railway website)

References

Railway stations in Fukuoka Prefecture
Railway stations in Japan opened in 1991
Heisei Chikuhō Railway Tagawa Line